Everybody Out! is the first album released by Boston's punk band, Everybody Out!. It was released in 2008.

Track listing
All songs by Barton/Sweeney.
 "Intro/Wide Awake" – 3:04
 "Everybody Out" – 1:59
 "Ghettoblaster" – 2:48
 "Jack The Lad" – 2:21
 "All I Got" – 2:26
 "Truth" – 1:54
 "Yeah Yeah Yeah Yeah" – 2:44
 "Billy Cole" – 3:58
 "Transistor Jim" – 3:31
 "No Runaway" – 3:15
 "Avenue" – 2:42
 "Evil Place/Revenge of Sweeney Todd" – 2:16

Personnel
C. Sweeney – Lead Vocals
B. Close – lead guitar, Vocals
Rick Barton – Guitar, Vocals
Kevin Garvin – Drums
Ethan Dussault – Engineer, Mixing
Reverend C.L. Moore – Vocals (background)
D. Smith – Bass
J. Stewart – Trombone
J. Michael Walker – Guitar, Mandolin
Nick Zampiello – Mastering

References

2008 debut albums
Taang! Records albums